Procopius Waldvogel (alternate spellings: Prokop Waldvogel or Procopius Waldfogel) was a medieval printer from Avignon. It is believed that he might have invented printing before Johannes Gutenberg. He flourished in the fifteenth century.

Life 

He was a German living in Avignon. He was a silversmith by trade.

He fled from Prague during the Hussite troubles and arrived in Avignon in 1444.

At Avignon he had two students: Manaud Vitalis and Arnaud de Coselhac.

His name appears in several contracts of that time, most notably the one in which he agrees to provide Davin de Caderousse with movable metal type of Hebrew letters.

He disappeared from the historical record after 1446.

Career 

It has been claimed that he owned molds for printing before Johannes Gutenberg in 1444. However, unlike Gutenberg, he did not print any books.

He had two alphabets and various metal forms and he offered to teach the art of artificial writing to a schoolteacher.

The French historian M. Requin believes, in 1890, that he might have invented the art of printing before Johannes Gutenberg. Unfortunately, Requin never showed any evidence that Waldvogel printed anything, and his allegations are long forgotten.

He was a contemporary of other printers of the time, which included Laurens Janszoon Coster, Jean Brito and Panfilo Castaldi.

Controversial printed quires possibly assigned to Waldfogel 

In 2015 two Hebrew-letter quires with a total of 32 pages were found to be reused in the cover of a book from the 16th century. They were sent by their owner to the Institute of Hebrew Manuscript Research at the National Library of Israel in Jerusalem. The study of their watermarks, paper, ink, typeset typography, made upon request of their owner, concluded that it may be possible that they could have been printed in the area of Avignon around 1444, suggesting that they might be Waldfogel and Davin de Caderousse's work. This finding has received some media coverage, although in the absence of a counter-expertise by independent scholars, the putative link between these printed quires and Waldfogel's entreprise remain purely speculative.

References

External links 

15th-century German businesspeople
Businesspeople from Avignon
German printers